Paul Kemp (20 May 1896 – 13 August 1953) was a German stage and film actor. Kemp worked as a piano accompaniest for silent films, and then served as an ambulance driver on the Western Front during the First World War. Post-war he moved into acting on the stage in Düsseldorf and Hamburg. His career really took off when he moved to Berlin in 1929, appearing in the hit stage version of the novel Menschen im Hotel by Vicki Baum. He made his film debut in 1930, shortly after the introduction of sound film. He appeared prolifically in German and Austrian films until his death in 1953.

Selected filmography

 Cyanide (1930) - Kuckuck
  (1930) - Aufnahmeleiter
 The King of Paris (1930)
 Rag Ball (1930) - Priem
 The Great Longing (1930) - Regieassistent Mopp
 Dolly Gets Ahead (1930) - Jack
 The Blonde Nightingale (1930) - Hirschfield
 The Threepenny Opera (1931) - Mackie Messers Platte
 Seitensprünge (1931) - Anton Schiller
 M (1931) - Pickpocket with Six Watches
 My Cousin from Warsaw (1931) - Der Nachbar
 The Theft of the Mona Lisa (1931) - Polizeileutnant
 Um eine Nasenlänge (1931) - Sperling, ein Rennbahnbesucher
 The Soaring Maiden (1931) - Dr. Kurt Winter
 Berlin-Alexanderplatz (1931)
 An Auto and No Money (1932) - Peter Knopf, Auslagendekorateur
 Three from the Unemployment Office (1932) - Arthur Jaenicke, Arbeitsloser
 Gitta Discovers Her Heart (1932) - Fred, sein Freund
 The Bartered Bride (1932) - Wenzel - ihr Sohn
 Sehnsucht 202 (1932) - Splitter / Silber
 Mieter Schulze gegen alle (1932)
 Gypsies of the Night (1932) - Julius
 A Man with Heart (1932) - Rochus Sperling
 A Song for You (1933) - Charlie, Gattis Impresario
 Roman einer Nacht (1933) - Nissen, ein Diener
 Invisible Opponent (1933) - Hans Mertens
 Ihre Durchlaucht, die Verkäuferin (1933) - Peter Knoll
 The Castle in the South (1933) - Ottoni
 The Song of Happiness (1933) - Bernhard Probst, sein Freund
 The Fugitive from Chicago (1933) - August P. Lemke, Buchhalter
 Mit dir durch dick und dünn (1934) - Kasimir Lampe, Bildhauer
 My Heart Calls You (1934) - Director Rosé
 My Heart Is Calling You (1934) - Homme dans le casino (uncredited)
 The Csardas Princess (1934) - Graf Bonipart Kancsianu
 Charley's Aunt (1934) - Fancourt 'Babbs' Babberley
 Prinzessin Turandot (1934) - Willibald
 Amphitryon (1935) - Götterbote Merkur / Diener Sosias
 The King's Prisoner (1935) - Fritz Böttger
 The Valiant Navigator (1935) - Berthold Jebs
 E lucean le stelle (1935)
 The Bashful Casanova (1936) - Innocenz Freisleben
 Hot Blood (1936) - Jozsi - Faktotum
 Boccaccio (1936) - Calandrino - Verleger und Buchdrucker
 Glückskinder (1936) - Frank Black
 Flowers from Nice (1936) - Rudi Hofer
 The Charm of La Boheme (1937) - Pierre Casale
 Die verschwundene Frau (1937) - Ferdinand Bartel
 Musik für dich (1937)
 Ihr Leibhusar (1938) - Bunko
 Capriccio (1938) - Henri de Grau
 Dir gehört mein Herz (1938) - Ricco
 Unsere kleine Frau (1938) - Bobby Brown
 Mia moglie si diverte (1938) - Paolo
 The Stars Shine (1938) - Himself
 Marionette (1939) - Rico
 Another Experience (1939) - Hausmann - Gardrobier
 Madame Butterfly (1939) - Richard Hell
 Kornblumenblau (1939)
 Was wird hier gespielt? (1940)
 Das leichte Mädchen (1940) - Bertel
 Der Kleinstadtpoet (1940) - Paul Schleemüller, Stadtsekretär
  (1941) - Max
 Immer nur Du (1941) - Sepp Zeisig
 Jenny und der Herr im Frack (1941) - Willy Krag
 A Gust of Wind (1942) - Emanuele Rigattieri
 The Big Number (1943) - Otto Gellert
 Fahrt ins Abenteuer (1943) - Rudi Waschek
 Das Lied der Nachtigall (1944) - Kapellmeister Schnepf
 Sieben Briefe (1944) - Kramer, Bildschriftleiter
 Glück unterwegs (1944) - Dramaturg Gustav
 Dir zuliebe (1944) - Karl Sinn
 Leuchtende Schatten (1945)
 Ghost in the Castle (1947) - Waldemar
 Lysistrata (1947) - Damon
 The Singing House (1947) - Karli Weidner
 Liebe nach Noten (1947) - Maximilian Schmidt
 The Heavenly Waltz (1948) - Spaatz
 Insolent and in Love (1948) - Der alte Pernrieder, Clarissas Großvater
 Lambert Feels Threatened (1949) - Bobby
 Dangerous Guests (1949) - Amadeus Strohmayer
 Unknown Sender (1950) - Schuldiener Bock
 Kein Engel ist so rein (1950) - Paul-Theodor
 The Man in Search of Himself (1950) - Theobald Finger
 Mädchen mit Beziehungen (1950) - Hahn
 Nacht ohne Sünde (1950) - Friedrich
 Third from the Right (1950) - Hähnchen
 The Midnight Venus (1951) - Hansl
 Engel im Abendkleid (1951)
  (1951) - "Häschen" Haas
 Das unmögliche Mädchen (1951) - Kronbecher
 In München steht ein Hofbräuhaus (1951) - Otto Kackelmann
 The Thief of Bagdad (1952) - Kalif Omar
 Queen of the Arena (1952) - Fritz Zwickel, Faktotum Mahnkes
 Salto Mortale (1953) - Willi
 A Musical War of Love (1953) - Prof. Melchior Quint
 Drei, von denen man spricht (1953) - Otto Kistenkugel (final film role)

References

Bibliography

External links

1896 births
1953 deaths
20th-century German male actors
Actors from Bonn
German male film actors
German male stage actors